The 17th Rifle Corps was a corps of the Red Army and later the Soviet Army, formed three times.

It was first formed in 1922 in the Soviet Far East before relocating to Ukraine two years later. It fought in the Soviet invasion of Poland and was destroyed during Operation Barbarossa in mid-1941. The corps was reformed in late 1942 in the Far East and fought in the Soviet invasion of Manchuria in August 1945 before being disbanded postwar later that year. It was formed for a third time in 1949 at Samarkand in the Turkestan Military District, becoming the 17th Army Corps in 1957. The 17th Army Corps relocated to Frunze in the Central Asian Military District in the late 1960s, serving there for the rest of the Cold War. After the Dissolution of the Soviet Union, it became the headquarters of the Ministry of Defense of Kyrgyzstan.

First formation 
The corps was initially first formed as the Primorsky Rifle Corps at Chita on 2 November 1922, part of the 5th Army. On 25 December, the corps became the 17th Primorsky Rifle Corps. In January 1924, the corps was relocated west to Vinnytsia on the other side of the Soviet Union, where it became part of the Ukrainian Military District and dropped the "Primorsky" designation. In May 1935, the 17th became part of the Kiev Military District when the Ukrainian Military District was split. As part of the 6th Army, the corps fought in the Soviet invasion of Poland in September 1939, occupying what became western Ukraine. After the end of the campaign in October, the corps headquarters was stationed at Chernivtsi and it became part of the Kiev Special Military District. Assigned to the 12th Army in May 1940, the corps fought against Operation Barbarossa, the German invasion of the Soviet Union, from 22 June 1941. The corps was disbanded in August of that year.

Second formation 
It was reformed in December 1942 in the Far East, part of the 25th Army. In August 1945 in the Far East it had the 187th Rifle Division and 366th Rifle Division. For the Soviet invasion of Manchuria in August 1945, the corps was transferred to the 5th Army. At the beginning of the invasion, the corps advanced in the 5th Army's first echelon. Its objective was to cut off the Japanese Northeastern and Eastern (Suifenho) Fortified Regions, alongside the 105th Fortified Area and several border guard battalions.

On the first day of the invasion, 9 August, the 187th Division fought in heavy combat for the control of railroad tunnels east of Suifenho, which were rapidly secured. The corps advanced southwards into the rear of the Suifenho Fortified Region, where they linked up with troops from the 25th Army's 39th Rifle Corps, completing the encirclement of the Tungning Fortified Region. The speedy Soviet advance prevented the Japanese troops from creating new defensive lines and from effectively resisting the attack.  At 17:00 on the same day, the corps was transferred to the 25th Army. After clearing the remaining Japanese troops from Tungning on 10 August, the 17th and 39th Corps began advancing southwest along the Tungning road to Wangching, Tumen, Tunhua, and Kirin on the next day. The two corps approached Laoheishan by noon on 12 August after marching between 18.6 and 25 miles .

For the next few days, the 10th Mechanized Corps and the two rifle corps advanced along the narrow road from Laoheishan to Heitosai, which forced the column to become strung out along the road. As a result, only the forward detachments and reconnaissance units met the negligible Japanese resistance before capturing Heitosai. 25th Army commander Ivan Chistyakov split the units in two columns, one of which included the 17th Corps and elements of the 10th Mechanized, advancing west towards the Taipingling Pass. The Soviet troops encountered Japanese defensive positions from the 128th Infantry Division's 284th Infantry Regiment at Lotzokou on 15 August. The 187th Division conducted a frontal attack while the 366th encircled the Japanese from the south. Meanwhile, the 10th  Corps' 72nd Mechanized Brigade bypassed the Japanese and advanced east to Taipingling Pass, where they were halted by the 285th Infantry Regiment of the 128th, which had constructed prepared defensive positions.

In the late evening of 16 August, the Soviet forces were able to capture both Lotzokou and Taipingling Pass after breaking through the Japanese defenses, continuing to pursue the remnants of the 128th Division westwards. The corps was disbanded in October 1945.

Third formation and 17th Army Corps 
In September 1949, the 17th Rifle Corps was reformed at Samarkand in the Turkestan Military District as part of a buildup of the Soviet Army. It initially included the 16th Guards Mechanized Division at Samarkand and the 360th Rifle Division at Termez. The 203rd Rifle Division at Karaganda also became part of the corps in 1949. In 1955, the 360th was renumbered as the 62nd Rifle Division, and the 203rd became the 30th. In 1957, the 62nd became the 108th Motor Rifle Division, the 203rd became the 102nd, and the 16th Guards the 90th Guards Motor Rifle Division. 

The corps became the 17th Army Corps in June of that year. In May 1962, the division became a training unit and was directly subordinated to the district headquarters. In the late 1960s, the corps headquarters moved to Frunze in the newly reformed Central Asian Military District, and took control of three motor rifle divisions: the 201st in Dushanbe, the 8th Guards (recently relocated from Tallinn to Frunze), and the 68th (moved from Uryupinsk to Taldykurgan). It also included two separate motor rifle regiments: the 30th at Korday and the 860th at Osh.

In January 1980, the 860th Separate Motor Rifle Regiment was sent to the 40th Army to fight in the Soviet–Afghan War. It was replaced by the 32nd Separate Motor Rifle Regiment, which transferred from Ordzhonikidze and soon became the 68th Separate Motor Rifle Brigade, the only Soviet Army mountain brigade. In February, the 201st Motor Rifle Division was also sent to Afghanistan, and was replaced by the 134th Motor Rifle Division, expanded from the former's 92nd Motor Rifle and 401st Tank Regiments. With three divisions and a brigade, the corps was equal in size to some combined arms armies. In the late 1980s, smaller corps units included the 525th Separate Spetsnaz Company, the 789th Separate Protection and Security Company, and the 78th Material Support Brigade at Frunze, the 78th Rocket Brigade at Unguras, the 303rd Separate Helicopter Squadron at Dushanbe, the 751st Separate Engineer-Sapper Battalion at Kalchagay, and the 13th Machine Gun Artillery Regiment, 179th Separate Reactive Artillery Battalion, and a separate radio-electronic warfare battalion at Sary-Ozek. In January 1989, after the Central Asian Military District was disbanded, the corps became part of the Turkestan Military District again. On 24 August, the 30th Regiment became part of the 8th Guards Division.

After the Dissolution of the Soviet Union, in the summer of 1992, the corps headquarters became the headquarters of the Ministry of Defense of Kyrgyzstan.

Organization 
1939:
 96th Rifle Division
 97th Rifle Division
 10th Tank Brigade
 38th Tank Brigade
1941:
 60th Mountain Rifle Division
 96th Mountain Rifle Division
 164th Mountain Rifle Division

Commanders 
The following officer is known to have commanded the corps' first formation:
 Major General Ivan Galanin (14 March26 August 1941)
The corps' second formation is known to have been commanded by the following officer:
 Major General Afanasy Kopychko (16 December 194224 August 1945)
The corps' third formation and the 17th Army Corps were commanded by the following officers:
 Major General Grigory Belov (19 September 1949 – 23 July 1954)
 Major General Nikolay Chunikhin (23 July 1954–June 1955)
 Major General  (June 1955 – 25 September 1958)
 Major General Anatoly Andrushchenko (26 September 1958 – 24 February 1961)
 Major General Yegor Kruglov (25 February 1961 – 3 December 1964)
 Major General (promoted to Lieutenant General 23 February 1967) Nikoaly Silchenko (4 December 1964 – 28 July 1967)
 Major General (promoted to Lieutenant General 29 April 1970) Sergey Borisov (29 July 1967 – 6 December 1971)
 Major General (promoted to Lieutenant General 4 November 1973) Vladimir Myakushko (6 December 1971–May 1975)
 Major General Fyodor Kuzmin (December 1982–September 1984)
 Major General Ivan Bizhan (November 1984–June 1987)
 Major General Viktor Kazantsev (1988–1990)

References

Citations

Bibliography 
 
 
 
 
 

Rifle corps of the Soviet Union
Military units and formations established in 1922
Military units and formations disestablished in 1945